Mark Williamson may refer to:

 Mark Williamson (biologist), British biologist
 Mark Williamson (baseball) (born 1959), retired American baseball player
 Mark Williamson (businessman) (born 1957), British businessman

See also
 Williamson (surname)